Mikhak (also Romanized as Mīkhak; also known as Mīkhak-e Seyyedābād) is a village in Gol Banu Rural District, Pain Jam District, Torbat-e Jam County, Razavi Khorasan Province, Iran. At the 2006 census, its population was 412, in 92 families.

References 

Populated places in Torbat-e Jam County